Three ships of the Royal Australian Navy have been named HMAS Adelaide, after Adelaide, the capital city of South Australia:

  was a Town-class light cruiser commissioned in 1922 and decommissioned in 1946
  was an Adelaide-class frigate commissioned in 1980 and decommissioned in 2008
  is a Canberra-class landing helicopter dock ship commissioned in 2015 and active as of 2022

Battle honours
Ships of the name HMAS Adelaide have earned four battle honours:

 Pacific 1941–43
 East Indies 1942
 East Timor 1999
 Persian Gulf 2001–02

References

Royal Australian Navy ship names